Huguenot, New York may refer to:

 Huguenot, Orange County, New York - a hamlet in the town of Deerpark, New York
 Huguenot, Staten Island, a neighborhood located in Staten Island, New York